Mumbai Mast Kallander is a 2011 Indian film starring Shilpa Shukla, Tarun Anand and Rajesh Vivek, Produced and Directed byAman Mihani.

Plot
Mumbai Mast Kallander is about a kidnapping gone wrong. The attempt is to create confusion and humour out of it. Two brother Ram and Shyam, petty criminals aspiring for Don-like status. Their dreams bring them to Mumbai, where they are hired to work as henchmen for Bade Bhai and after kidnapping start confusion and more confusion.

Cast
 Mohsin as Ram Lakhan Yadav
 Muzzi as Shyam Lakhan Yadav
 Shilpa Shukla as Rhea
 Luna as Megha Chatterjee
 Tarun Anand as Aditya
 Shankar Sachdev as Inspector Shankar Sachdev
 Aakash Deep as Havaldar Pingle
 Rajendra Sethi as Vikram
 Rajesh Vivek as Badey Bhaiya
 Ashraf Ul Haq as Shahenshah
 Vineet Kapoor as Hitlet Yaadya
 Raj Shekhar
 Muskan Kocher as Young Megha Chatterjee

Critical response
Mumbai DNA newspaper gave 2.5 out of 5 stars, Noyon Jyoti Parasara gave 1 out of 5 stars, stating, "Overall Mumbai Mast Kallander does not generate any interest, especially when you have far better options like Yamla Pagla Deewana in the same genre. And neither does the director have good enough reasons to call the film by the name. Interestingly just over a month back we had seen another "kidnapping gone wrong comedy" in Phas Gaye Re Obama. Bollywood indeed is a perfect example of diversity!".  Blessy Chettiar described, "Debutant director (and producer) Aman Mihani has made a forgettable attempt with Mumbai Mast Kallander. Reasons to go catch this one in a theatre are too few and far between. You could wait for its television release without missing too much."

Soundtrack

References

External links 
 

2010s Hindi-language films